František Čermák and Leoš Friedl were the defending champions.

Čermák and Friedl successfully defended their title, defeating Vasilis Mazarakis and Boris Pašanski 6–1, 6–2 in the final.

Seeds

  František Čermák /  Leoš Friedl (champions)
  Mariusz Fyrstenberg /  Marcin Matkowski (first round)
  Agustín Calleri /  Gastón Etlis (quarterfinals)
  Martín García /  Sebastián Prieto (semifinals, withdrew)

Draw

Draw

References
Main Draw

ATP Buenos Aires
2006 ATP Tour